Elizabeth Kugmucheak Alooq (born 1943) is an Inuit artist who lives in Baker Lake, Nunavut. She is the daughter of Marjorie Siksi'naaq Tutannuaq who was also an Inuit artist from Baker Lake.

Her work is included in the collections of the McMichael Canadian Art Collection and the Winnipeg Art Gallery.

References

1943 births
20th-century Canadian artists
20th-century Canadian women artists
21st-century Canadian artists
21st-century Canadian women artists
Inuit artists
Living people
Date of birth missing (living people)
Artists from Nunavut
People from Baker Lake